Lupinus kingii (King's lupine) is a species of Lupinus, family Fabaceae, which can be found in Arizona, Colorado, Nevada, New Mexico, Utah. In Utah, it is found only at Bryce Canyon National Park.

References

External links
Photos of Lupinus kingii which were taken in Flagstaff, Arizona

kingii
Flora of Arizona
Flora of Colorado
Flora of Nevada
Flora of New Mexico
Flora of Utah
Flora without expected TNC conservation status